George W. Bryant (June 9, 1873 – May 6, 1947) was an American college sports coach, administrator, and professor.  He served as head football coach at the Virginia Military Institute (VMI) in Lexington, Virginia from 1895 to 1896, and at Coe College in Cedar Rapids, Iowa from 1899 to 1913, compiling a career college football record of 53–70–9.  Bryant died at the age of 73, on May 6, 1947, at a hospital in Cedar Rapids.

Head coaching record

References

External links
 

1873 births
1947 deaths
19th-century players of American football
American football ends
American football halfbacks
American men's basketball players
Basketball coaches from New Jersey
Basketball players from Jersey City, New Jersey
Players of American football from Jersey City, New Jersey
Coe College faculty
Coe Kohawks athletic directors
Coe Kohawks baseball players
Coe Kohawks football coaches
Coe Kohawks football players
Coe Kohawks men's basketball coaches
Coe Kohawks men's basketball players
VMI Keydets football coaches
College men's tennis players in the United States
College men's track and field athletes in the United States
College track and field coaches in the United States
Princeton University alumni
Sportspeople from Jersey City, New Jersey
Tennis people from New Jersey
Track and field athletes from New Jersey